"Be My Lover Now" is a song by British singer and songwriter Philip Oakey and producer Giorgio Moroder. It was written by Oakey and Moroder and recorded for the album Philip Oakey & Giorgio Moroder. It was released as a single in the UK in August 1985 where it reached number 74 on the singles charts and remained on the charts for 1 week. It was the third and final single to be released from the brief Oakey/Moroder partnership which had started with the hit single "Together in Electric Dreams" (1984).

Because the single was not a commercial success and neither was the album, it effectively ended the short-lived partnership between Oakey and Moroder in 1985. Oakey returned to work with his band the Human League full-time.

Music video

The music video for "Be My Lover Now" was less extravagant than the high budget video for the previous single "Good-Bye Bad Times".

The video has a surreal theme and features Philip Oakey performing on stage in an ornate theatre, with 3 female backing singers/dancers and two female podium dancers either side of the stage who are dressed identically to an audience of identical blue dress wearing female 'clones' in their 30s/40s who are competing for Oakey's attention.

References

External links
http://www.the-black-hit-of-space.dk/be_my_lover.htm

1985 songs
1985 singles
Philip Oakey songs
Giorgio Moroder songs
Songs written by Philip Oakey
Songs written by Giorgio Moroder
Song recordings produced by Giorgio Moroder
Virgin Records singles